The Kimel AP-9 is a pistol that was manufactured by A. A. Arms and distributed by Kimel Industries, Inc of Indian Trail, North Carolina. A. A. Arms began manufacturing the AP-9 in 1988 and did so until 1994.  The AP-9 resembles the TEC-9.

The standard AP-9 has a 5-inch barrel; the AP-9 target began with a 12-inch barrel (Target AP-9), but this was later reduced to 11 inches (AP-9/11 Target); they both have a separate fore end and a fluted barrel.  These firearms were banned by most states after the passage of the Federal Assault Weapons Ban. After the Assault Weapons Ban of 1994 a ten-round magazine was introduced.  Original magazines included 10-round and 20-round capacities.

This firearm had original accessories of a hard plastic case, a nylon case with extra magazine pouches, a forward handle, a flash suppressor and recoil compensator as well as a barrel extension.

References

Semi-automatic pistols of the United States
9mm Parabellum semi-automatic pistols